Ge Cunzhuang ) was a Chinese actor. He won the Golden Rooster Award for Best Supporting Actor in 1998, for Zhou Enlai, A Great Friend. On 4 March 2016, he died at the age of 87.

Ge You is his son.

Selected filmography
Once Upon a Time in China III (1993)
Spicy Love Soup (1997)
Waiting Alone (2004)
Little Soldier Zhang Ga (2005)
Call for Love (2007)
The Founding of a Republic (2009)

References

External links

1929 births
2016 deaths
Chinese male film actors
20th-century Chinese male actors
21st-century Chinese male actors
People from Hengshui
Male actors from Hebei
Chinese male television actors